Galitos Futebol Clube is a basketball team based in Barreiro, Portugal, that currently plays in the LPB.

History
The club played for the first time to the Portuguese first league in 2012.

Achievements
Portuguese Basketball Cup:
Runner-up: 2013–14
Portuguese Basketball Super Cup:
Runner-up: 2014

References

External links
Club official Facebook
Profile at the Portuguese Basketball Federation
Profile at Eurobasket.com

Basketball teams in Portugal